Sefteh-ye Hoseyn Khan (also Romanized as Sefteh-ye Ḩoseyn Khān and Sefteh-e Ḩosein Khān; also known as Sefteh) is a village in Golzar Rural District, in the Central District of Bardsir County, Kerman Province, Iran. At the 2006 census, its population was 16, in 4 families.

References 

Populated places in Bardsir County